Sir James Alexander Young  (23 March 1875 – 17 April 1956), known as Alexander Young, was a New Zealand politician of the Reform Party.

Biography

Young was born in Auckland in 1875 to Irish immigrant parents from County Sligo. He was by profession a dentist. He was elected to the Hamilton Borough Council at the young age of 22. He was Mayor of Hamilton from 1909 to 1912.

He then represented the Waikato electorate from 1911 to 1922, and then the Hamilton electorate from 1922 to 1935, when he was defeated.

He was Minister of Health (18 January 1926 – 10 December 1928) and Minister of Industries and Commerce (28 November 1928 – 10 December 1928) in the Coates Ministry of the Reform Government of New Zealand.  He was Minister of Health (22 September 1931 – 6 December 1935), Minister of Immigration (22 September 1931 – 6 December 1935) and Minister of Internal Affairs (28 January 1933 – 6 December 1935) in the United Government.

He was Chairman of Committees from 24 July 1923 to 14 October 1925.

In 1935, Young was appointed a Knight Commander of the Royal Victorian Order and was awarded the King George V Silver Jubilee Medal.

He was vice-president of the New Zealand Alliance in 1929, and was on the Waikato Licensing Bench for fourteen years. He was on the Board of Governors of Hamilton High School and chairman of the Hospital Board.

He died in 1956 and was buried at the Hamilton East Cemetery.

Notes

References 

|-

|-

1875 births
1956 deaths
Reform Party (New Zealand) MPs
Members of the Cabinet of New Zealand
Mayors of Hamilton, New Zealand
Members of the New Zealand House of Representatives
New Zealand MPs for North Island electorates
New Zealand dentists
New Zealand people of Irish descent
New Zealand Knights Commander of the Royal Victorian Order
Unsuccessful candidates in the 1935 New Zealand general election
Hamilton City Councillors
New Zealand politicians awarded knighthoods
New Zealand temperance activists
Burials at Hamilton East Cemetery